Hettie Macdonald is an English film, theatre and television director. Macdonald is known as the director of the Hugo Award-winning 2007 episode of Doctor Who, "Blink". She has won numerous awards including one BAFTA Television Award for Best Single Drama, one Hugo Award, and a Grand Prix award. She has been nominated for numerous awards, including 2 BAFTA Television Awards.

"Blink" is frequently named as the best episode of Doctor Who since the series' 2005 revival. In 2009, SFX named the episode's climax as the scariest moment in Doctor Who history, citing its "perfect direction". Macdonald would return to the series in 2015 to direct the year's opening story.

She has also directed for the stage. She studied English at Bristol University before training as a director at the Royal Court Theatre, and was formerly associate director at the Wolsey Theatre, Ipswich.

Selected credits

Film

Television

Theatre

Awards and nominations

See also
 List of female film and television directors
 List of LGBT-related films directed by women

References

External links

Living people
Alumni of the University of Bristol
English film directors
English television directors
English theatre directors
English women film directors
Hugo Award winners
Place of birth missing (living people)
Year of birth missing (living people)
British women television directors